Waldmohr is a former Verbandsgemeinde ("collective municipality") in the district of Kusel, Rhineland-Palatinate, Germany. On 1 January 2017 it merged into the new Verbandsgemeinde Oberes Glantal. The seat of the Verbandsgemeinde was in Waldmohr.

The Verbandsgemeinde Waldmohr consisted of the following Ortsgemeinden ("local municipalities"):

 Breitenbach
 Dunzweiler
 Waldmohr

Former Verbandsgemeinden in Rhineland-Palatinate